North Oakley is a hamlet in the civil parish of Hannington in the Basingstoke and Deane district of Hampshire, England.

Governance
The hamlet of North Oakley is part of the civil parish of Hannington, (where the 2011 Census was included)  and is part of the Kingsclere ward of Basingstoke and Deane borough council. The borough council is a Non-metropolitan district of Hampshire County Council.

References

Villages in Hampshire